{{Infobox person
| name               = Han Na-na
| image              =
| birth_name         = Han Na-na
| birth_date         = 
| birth_place        = Seoul, South Korea
| other_names        = Hannah, Hannah Na, Hanna, Nana, Hannana
| education          = Michigan State University (Bachelor of Arts)
| occupation         = Actress, Model
| years_active       = 1999–present
| agent              = Media Dream Entertainment
| known_for          = Autumn in My HeartLove Wind Love Song
}}

Han Na-na is a South Korean actress and model. She is known for her role in Autumn in My Heart as Shin Yoo-mi. She also appeared in the movie, Love Wind Love Song.

Early life
She was born on January 30, 1979, in South Korea. Since childhood, she loved dancing and learned ballet in elementary school and won many competitions at a very young age. She went abroad to study Ballet in Boston Ballet School, but due to knee injury she had to leave dance. She completed her studies from Michigan State University and joined Media Dream Entertainment. 

 Career 
In 1999, she made her acting debut in the movie, Love Wind Love Song and that year won the Miss Korea pageant as Miss Korea-Sun. In 2000, she appeared in the music video, "You Know" by Jo Sung-mo. The same year she landed her first main role in a television series in the KBS2 drama Autumn in My Heart'', appearing alongside Song Hye-kyo, Won Bin and Song Seung-heon.

Filmography

Television series

Film

Music video

Awards and nominations
 1999 Miss Korea Seoul Sun
 1999 The 43rd Miss Korea Sun

References

External links
 

1979 births
Living people
21st-century South Korean actresses
South Korean female models
South Korean television actresses
South Korean film actresses